The Original House of Pies is an American restaurant chain, started c. 1969 by Al Lapin Jr., an early franchise system designer and founder of International Industries Inc. who was also responsible for International House of Pancakes, Copper Penny Coffee Shops, Orange Julius, and others.

Specializing in many different flavors of pie available for dessert, the chain was popular up through 1976 when it was sold by IHOP Corporation (International Industries successor), to Robert Herndon, who eventually downsized the chain's locations. By c. 1986 the franchise chain filed for bankruptcy and closed most of its locations.

Some individually owned and operated restaurants remain in Houston and Los Angeles and have kept the House of Pies name and logo.

Cultural impact 
Original House of Pies is mentioned in the episode "Cowboys and Iranians" during Will & Grace's eighth season in 2006. While reading the resume of a prospective employee from Iran, Grace Adler comments that she had "no idea they had House of Pies in Tehran". 

The founders of Compaq are reported to have made initial plans on a placemat in an Original House of Pies coffee shop in Houston.

References

External links
 House of Pies Houston
 House of Pies Los Angeles

Economy of Los Angeles
Economy of Houston
Restaurants established in 1965
Restaurants in California
Restaurants in Texas
Defunct restaurant chains in the United States